Caldueñu (: Caldueño) is one of 28 parishes (administrative divisions) in the municipality of Llanes in eastern Asturias, in northern Spain.  It is just south of the Mazucu mountain and the village of El Mazuco (where the Battle of El Mazuco occurred in 1937 during the Spanish Civil War).

Villages
 Buda - Las Jareras
 Caldueñin
 Cortines
 Debodes
 El Mazuco
 Villa

References

Parishes in Llanes